MFL may refer to:

Football leagues

England
Manchester Football League
Midland Football League (1994)
Midland Football League (2014)

United States
Midwest Football League (1935–1940)
Midwest Football League (1962–1978)

Elsewhere
Malaysian Football League
Mallee Football League, South Australia
Maritime Football League, Canada
Media Football League, Russia

Technology
Magnetic flux leakage, a steel corrosion testing method
Male flare fitting, in home brewing
Message Format Language, in computing

Other uses
Manitoba Federation of Labour, a Canadian trade union
Market–Frankford Line, a rapid transit rail line in Philadelphia, Pennsylvania, US
Modern foreign languages, teaching living second languages to children